Indians in Switzerland are the people who migrated from India to Switzerland. According to the Indian Embassy, The Indian community in Switzerland numbers approximately 24,567 Indians including over 7164 persons of Indian origin, most of whom are professionals, notably the information technology sector, the pharmaceutical industry and the research and health sector. It is concentrated in Zurich, Geneva, Basel, Baden, Bern and Lausanne in that order. There are about 1000 Indian students studying in Switzerland

Notable people
 Ankita Makwana, actress
 Neel Jani, racing driver
 Leela Naidu, actress

See also 
 India–Switzerland relations
 Hinduism in Switzerland

References 

India–Switzerland relations
Ethnic groups in Switzerland
Switzerland
Switzerland
Swiss people of Indian descent